Libya is a country that is located in the northern part of Africa, it is mostly dominated by Muslims as such the laws of the country are bent on the Islamic religion. All Sharia based Libyan banks have resorted to financing that  delivers  a  predetermined  return  on  investment  to  avoid  the  increased  risk  of  short-term  financing,  and  then  the  banks  have  only changed the name of their transactions. Banks that are based  on  the  Sharia  do  not  have  the  support  of  the  central  bank  of Libya, and a lack of trained staff to choose.

History and development
Basically the ides of changing commercial banks to Islamic banks was instituted in the 20th century The development of the banking system is a key objective and it must be treated with great importance  in  the  present  as  an  issue  that  is crucial  in  the  future  of  the  economy,  so  we  can  not  activate  the  role  to  be  played  by  the  State  and  its  various  institutions, particularly the Central Bank to activate this development as create   a   legislative   environment   to   suit   the   latest  developments  in  international  banking,  especially  in  light  of  globalization and global economic liberalization. basically the development of Islamic banks have met a stunted growth in Libya, reasons being that these banks are founded with the idea of non interest service facilities.

References

Economy of Libya
Islamic banking